Neville Taylor (born 22 June 1953) is  a former Australian rules footballer who played with Fitzroy in the Victorian Football League (VFL).

Notes

External links 		
		
		
		
		
		
		
Living people		
1953 births		
		
Australian rules footballers from Victoria (Australia)		
Fitzroy Football Club players
Warrnambool Football Club players